International War Criminal is an EP by The Slackers first released in 2004. The five-song single, released by Thought Squad, continues the band's turn to more politically themed lyrics first heard on their 2003 release, Close My Eyes.

The EP features a full-band version of the song "International War Criminal" which first appeared on Vic Ruggiero's second solo album, Alive at the Ladybug House. A dub version of "Propaganda" also appears on The Slackers/Pulley Split and An Afternoon in Dub. All five songs also appear on Peculiar, although all except "Rider" are re-recorded.

Track listing
 "Propaganda"  – 4:09
 "Rider"  – 4:04
 "International War Criminal"  – 3:20
 "Keep It Simple"  – 3:15
 "Crazy"  – 3:24

2004 EPs
The Slackers EPs